Kord-e Shul (also Romanized as Kord-e Shūl and Kord Shūl; also known as Kurshūr) is a village in Madar Soleyman Rural District, Hakhamanish District, Pasargad County, Fars Province, Iran. At the 2006 census, its population was 972, in 238 families.

References 

Populated places in Pasargad County